The 1980 Arizona Wildcats baseball team represented the University of Arizona in the 1980 NCAA Division I baseball season. The team was coached by Jerry Kindall in his 8th season at Arizona.

Roster

Schedule 

! style="" | Regular Season
|- valign="top" 

|- align="center" bgcolor="#ddffdd"
| February 7 ||  || 12-3 || 1-0 || –
|- align="center" bgcolor="#ffdddd"
| February 9 || Cal State Fullerton || 1-4 || 1-1 || –
|- align="center" bgcolor="#ddffdd"
| February 10 || Cal State Fullerton || 7-1 || 2-1 || –
|- align="center" bgcolor="#ffffdd"
| February 16 ||  || 15-15 || 2-1-1 || –
|- align="center" bgcolor="#ffdddd"
| February 18 ||  || 3-5 || 2-2-1 || –
|- align="center" bgcolor="#ddffdd"
| February 19 || San Diego State || 7-2 || 3-2-1 || –
|- align="center" bgcolor="#ddffdd"
| February 20 || San Diego State || 14-8 || 4-2-1 || –
|- align="center" bgcolor="#ddffdd"
| February 22 ||  || 20-18 || 5-2-1 || –
|- align="center" bgcolor="#ddffdd"
| February 23 || La Verne || 4-0 || 6-2-1 || –
|- align="center" bgcolor="#ddffdd"
| February 23 || La Verne || 30-8 || 7-2-1 || –
|- align="center" bgcolor="#ffdddd"
| February 25 ||  || 1-2 || 7-3-1 || –
|- align="center" bgcolor="#ddffdd"
| February 26 || UC Riverside || 13-3 || 8-3-1 || –
|- align="center" bgcolor="#ffdddd"
| February 29 || at  || 6-10 || 8-4-1 || 0-1
|-

|- align="center" bgcolor="#ffdddd"
| March 1 || at Stanford || 6-8 || 8-5-1 || 0-2
|- align="center" bgcolor="#ddffdd"
| March 2 || at Stanford || 3-2 || 9-5-1 || 1-2
|- align="center" bgcolor="#ddffdd"
| March 6 ||  || 4-1 || 10-5-1 || 2-2
|- align="center" bgcolor="#ffdddd"
| March 7 || Southern California || 6-9 || 10-6-1 || 2-3
|- align="center" bgcolor="#ddffdd"
| March 8 || Southern California || 8-7 || 11-6-1 || 3-3
|- align="center" bgcolor="#ddffdd"
| March 11 ||  || 12-6 || 12-6-1 || –
|- align="center" bgcolor="#ddffdd"
| March 11 || Gonzaga || 3-1 || 13-6-1 || –
|- align="center" bgcolor="#ffdddd"
| March 13 || at  || 1-5 || 13-7-1 || 3–4
|- align="center" bgcolor="#ffdddd"
| March 14 || at UCLA || 2-8 || 13-8-1 || 3–5
|- align="center" bgcolor="#ffdddd"
| March 15 || at UCLA || 5-7 || 13-9-1 || 3–6
|- align="center" bgcolor="#ddffdd"
| March 17 || vs.  || 8-4 || 14-9-1 || –
|- align="center" bgcolor="#ffdddd"
| March 18 || vs.  || 3-8 || 14-10-1 || –
|- align="center" bgcolor="#ddffdd"
| March 18 || vs.  || 9-4 || 15-10-1 || –
|- align="center" bgcolor="#ffdddd"
| March 19 || vs.  || 0-10 || 15-11-1 || –
|- align="center" bgcolor="#ffdddd"
| March 20 || vs.  || 2-2 || 15-12-1 || –
|- align="center" bgcolor="#ddffdd"
| March 20 || vs.  || 18-6 || 16-12-1 || –
|- align="center" bgcolor="#ddffdd"
| March 22 || vs.  || 7-5 || 17-12-1 || –
|- align="center" bgcolor="#ddffdd"
| March 22 || vs. San Diego State || 7-7 || 18-12-1 || –
|- align="center" bgcolor="#ddffdd"
| March 24 || vs.  || 6-2 || 19-12-1 || –
|- align="center" bgcolor="#ddffdd"
| March 25 || vs. Colorado || 3-0 || 20-12-1 || –
|- align="center" bgcolor="#ffdddd"
| March 27 ||  || 5-6 || 20-13-1 || 3-7
|- align="center" bgcolor="#ddffdd"
| March 28 || California || 4-3 || 21-13-1 || 4-7
|- align="center" bgcolor="#ddffdd"
| March 29 || California || 14-9 || 22-13-1 || 5-7
|-

|- align="center" bgcolor="#ffdddd"
| April 3 || at  || 2-3 || 22-14-1 || 5–8
|- align="center" bgcolor="#ddffdd"
| April 4 || at Arizona State || 11-5 || 23-14-1 || 6–8
|- align="center" bgcolor="#ddffdd"
| April 5 || at Arizona State || 14-7 || 24-14-1 || 7–8
|- align="center" bgcolor="#ddffdd"
| April 8 ||  || 11-7 || 25-14-1 || –
|- align="center" bgcolor="#ddffdd"
| April 10 || UCLA || 3-2 || 26-14-1 || 8–8
|- align="center" bgcolor="#ddffdd"
| April 11 || UCLA || 17-1 || 27-14-1 || 9–8
|- align="center" bgcolor="#ffdddd"
| April 12 || UCLA || 3-4 || 27-15-1 || 9–9
|- align="center" bgcolor="#ffdddd"
| April 14 || Northern Arizona || 4-10 || 27-16-1 || –
|- align="center" bgcolor="#ddffdd"
| April 14 || Northern Arizona || 8-0 || 28-16-1 || –
|- align="center" bgcolor="#ddffdd"
| April 17 || Stanford || 6-4 || 29-16-1 || 10–9
|- align="center" bgcolor="#ddffdd"
| April 18 || Stanford || 15-6 || 30-16-1 || 11–9
|- align="center" bgcolor="#ddffdd"
| April 19 || Stanford || 7-5 || 31-16-1 || 12–9
|- align="center" bgcolor="#ddffdd"
| April 22 ||  || 14-5 || 32-16-1 || –
|- align="center" bgcolor="#ffdddd"
| April 24 || at Southern California || 2-3 || 32-17-1 || 12–10
|- align="center" bgcolor="#ddffdd"
| April 25 || at Southern California || 9-7 || 33-17-1 || 13–10
|- align="center" bgcolor="#ddffdd"
| April 26 || at Southern California || 9-3 || 34-17-1 || 14–10
|-

|- align="center" bgcolor="#ddffdd"
| May 1 || at California || 4-3 || 35-17-1 || 15–10
|- align="center" bgcolor="#ddffdd"
| May 2 || at California || 9-8 || 36-17-1 || 16–10
|- align="center" bgcolor="#ffdddd"
| May 3 || at California || 0-2 || 36-18-1 || 16–11
|- align="center" bgcolor="#ffdddd"
| May 8 || Arizona State || 8-14 || 36-19-1 || 16–12
|- align="center" bgcolor="#ffdddd"
| May 9 || Arizona State || 6-8 || 36-20-1 || 16–13
|- align="center" bgcolor="#ddffdd"
| May 10 || Arizona State || 22-4 || 37-20-1 || 17–13
|-

|-
|-
! style="" | Postseason
|- valign="top"

|- align="center" bgcolor="#ddffdd"
| May 23 || vs.  || 5-4 || 38-20-1
|- align="center" bgcolor="#ddffdd"
| May 24 || vs. Gonzaga || 13-9 || 39-20-1
|- align="center" bgcolor="#ddffdd"
| May 25 || vs. Gonzaga || 8-5 || 40-20-1
|-

|- align="center" bgcolor="ffdddd"
| May 30 || vs.  || Rosenblatt Stadium || 1-6 || 40-21-1
|- align="center" bgcolor="ddffdd"
| May 31 || vs. Florida State || Rosenblatt Stadium || 5-3 || 41-21-1
|- align="center" bgcolor="ddffdd"
| June 2 || vs. Michigan || Rosenblatt Stadium || 8-0 || 42-21-1
|- align="center" bgcolor="ddffdd"
| June 4 || vs. Hawaii || Rosenblatt Stadium || 6-4 || 43-21-1
|- align="center" bgcolor="ddffdd"
| June 5 || vs. California || Rosenblatt Stadium || 11-10 || 44-21-1
|- align="center" bgcolor="ddffdd"
| June 6 || vs. Hawaii || Rosenblatt Stadium || 5-3 || 45-21-1
|-

Awards and honors 
Craig Barger
 College World Series All-Tournament Team

Wes Clements
 First Team All-American
 First Team All-Pac-10 South
 College World Series All-Tournament Team

Terry Francona
 Golden Spikes Award
 The Sporting News Player of the Year
 First Team All-American
 Pac-10 South Player of the Year
 College World Series Most Outstanding Player

Craig Lefferts
 College World Series All-Tournament Team

John Moses
 First Team All-Pac-10 South

Dwight Taylor
 First Team All-Pac-10 South

Wildcats in the 1980 MLB Draft 
The following members of the Arizona Wildcats baseball program were drafted in the 1980 Major League Baseball Draft.

Notes 
  As part of the Sun Lite Classic, Arizona lost 7-14 as a result of a tiebreaker.
  As part of the Sun Lite Classic, Arizona won 28-16 as a result of a tiebreaker.

References 

Arizona
Arizona Wildcats baseball seasons
NCAA Division I Baseball Championship seasons
College World Series seasons
Pac-12 Conference baseball champion seasons
1980 in sports in Arizona